The Clemson University Historic District II is a collection of historic properties on the campus of Clemson University in Clemson, South Carolina. The district contains 7 contributing properties located in the central portion of the campus.  It was listed on the National Register of Historic Places in 1990.

Contributing properties

See also
Clemson University Historic District I
Campus of Clemson University

References

Historic District II
Historic districts on the National Register of Historic Places in South Carolina
National Register of Historic Places in Pickens County, South Carolina
University and college buildings on the National Register of Historic Places in South Carolina
Victorian architecture in South Carolina